East Bengal Football Club Women, commonly referred to as East Bengal (Bengali pronunciation: [ˈi:st ˌbenˈɡɔːl]), is a women's football club based in Kolkata, West Bengal. It is the women's football section of East Bengal FC. They currently compete in the Kanyashree Cup, the top flight tournament of women's football in the state of West Bengal under the Indian Football Association.

History

Formation and early beginnings in CWFL 
The East Bengal women's football team was formed in 2001 and in their inaugural season of the Calcutta Women's Football League, they lifted the title defeating arch-rivals Mohun Bagan 1–0 in the final at the Rabindra Sarobar Stadium with Shanta Dhara scoring the solitary goal for the club. The following season, East Bengal women's team reached the final again but lost in the final against Mohun Bagan after the game ended 1–1 in the regulation time and Mohun Bagan won 3–2 in the penalty shootout at the Sailen Manna Stadium in Howrah.  The team was however disbanded after the season.

Relaunch in 2019 and the 2020 season 
In the centenary year, the East Bengal club again decided to relaunch the women's team and participate in the Calcutta Women's Football League. They have appointed former India International Kuntala Ghosh Dastidar as the head coach of the team. In October, initial trials were conducted by the club under renowned footballer Kuntala Ghosh Dastidar, with over 150 women participating. On 27 December, IFA registration of 21 players was done for the Women's League that commenced in January 2020. The East Bengal Women's team started off their campaign in the 2020 Kanyashree Cup in style as they defeated Dipti Sangha by 6–1.

On 13 February the East Bengal Women's team made history as they faced Biddyut Sporting. They led 18-0 within 30 minutes of the game when the opposing team forfeited the game and the referee awarded it to East Bengal. On 6 March, the East Bengal Women's team surpassed their own record once again as they scored 20 goals against Bhangore SWF. East Bengal's forward Tulsi Hembram scored 8 goals and Mamata Hansda 4. The team qualified for the Super Six competition without losing a single game, and qualified for the Semi-Final where they faced Police AC. East Bengal won the semi-final 5–4 in the penalty shootout after the game had ended 1–1 in regulation time. However, the game was replayed due to issues with player registration and East Bengal team once again won the replayed match 5–4 in the penalties after the game ended goalless to reach the final. In the final, they met the two-times defending champions SSB Women's FC. On 30 December 2020, East Bengal faced SSB Women's at the Salt Lake Stadium in the final of the Kanyashree Cup and finished runners up with a 2–0 loss, with a goal conceded in each half.

2021 season 
Due to tussle between the club officials and the investor group Shree Cement, the women football team and all the players were released by the management. It was informed that they would not be fielding a team for the 2021–22 Kanyashree Cup.

2022 season 
In 2022, the East Bengal women's football team was re-formed after Emami group came on board as the new investors of the club. They began the season by participating in the Kaliaganj MLA Cup held at Uttar Dinajpur and won the four-team tournament by defeating MLA Kaliaganj 1–0 in the final. On 18 December, they announced the squad for the 2022–23 Kanyashree Cup. East Bengal started their campaign with a 2–0 win against WB Police on 20 December at the Rabindra Sarobar Stadium, with Sulanjana Raul and Kabita Saren scoring for the team. On 10 January 2023, in their fourth match of the season, East Bengal defeated Behala Aikya Sammilani by 35–0, creating a record as the biggest win by an Indian team in any women's football game conducted by AIFF. Mousumi Murmu and Kabita Saren scored six goals each, Deblina Bhattacharjee and Gita Das scored five each, Sushmita Bardhan scored four, Aishwarya Arun Jagtap scored thrice, Sulanjana Raul and Tanushree Oraon scored a brace while Birsi Oraon and Piyali Kora scored one each. On 19 January, East Bengal defeated Adivasi United Students Club 3–0 in the last match of the group stages to enter the knockouts as they finished top of their group with seven wins out of seven, including two walkovers given by Dipti Sangha and Kolkata Union Sporting Club, having scored fifty-eight goals in the five matches without conceding a single goal. On 23 January, East Bengal faced New Alipore Suruchi Sangha in the quarter-finals and won 2–1 with goals from Mousumi Murmu and Sulanjana Raul. On 25 January, East Bengal defeated Mohammedan Sporting 3–0 in the semi-finals at the Kishore Bharati Krirangan. Rimpa Halder scored a brace while Nimita Gurung of Mohammedan scored an own goal as East Bengal reached the final of the 2022–23 Kanyashree Cup. On 28 January, East Bengal faced Sreebhumi in the final of the Kanyashree Cup at the Kishore Bharati Krirangan and won 1–0 courtesy of a solitary goal from 15 year old Sulanjana Raul as East Bengal became the champions for the second time after 2001 and qualified for the Indian Women's League.

2022–23 Kanyashree Cup

Stadium

East Bengal Ground 

The East Bengal Ground is located in Kolkata, India and is the home ground of the club. The stadium lies on the Maidan (Kolkata) area on the northern side of Fort William and near the Eden Gardens. This stadium is used mostly for matches of Men's team in Calcutta Football League and academy players.

Players

Current technical staff

Records and Statistics

League history

Overall record in Kanyashree Cup

Top scorers in Kanyashree Cup
List of Top scorers for East Bengal in the Kanyashree Cup
Player names in bold are part of the current squad.

Club captains 
List of East Bengal Women's Football Team captains since the re-establishment in 2020.

Coach history
List of East Bengal Women's Football Team head coach since the re-establishment in 2020.

Honours

Domestic
 Calcutta Women's Football League (Kanyashree Cup)
 Champions (2): 2001, 2022–23
 Runners-up (2): 2002, 2019–20

 Kaliaganj MLA Cup
 Champions (1): 2022

Notes

References

External links
 Official website

East Bengal Club
Women's football clubs in India
2001 establishments in West Bengal
Association football clubs established in 2001
Football clubs in Kolkata